Salitre is Spanish for saltpeter and may refer to:

Geography 
 Salitre (Costa Rica), an indigenous territory of Costa Rica
 Salitre, Ceará, a municipality of Ceara, Brazil
 El Salitre, town in Hidalgo, Mexico
 El Salitre (wetland), a wetland in Bogotá, Colombia
 Salitre Canton, Guayas Province, Ecuador
 Salitre River, a river in Bahía State, Brazil
 Salitre River, Bogotá, river on the Bogotá savanna in Colombia

Other uses
 One of the joint South America air forces maneuvers
 Teatro do Salitre, theatre in Lisbon, Portugal between 1782 and 1858

See also
 
 Saltpeter (disambiguation)